After Hours is the second studio album by the American pop band, Timeflies, released through Island Records on April 29, 2014.

Background 

The recording of the album took place between 2012 and 2013 in their home studio in New York City.

Chart performance 
On the issue dated May 17, 2014, After Hours debuted at number 8 on the US Billboard 200, selling 20,000 copies in its first week.  The album has sold 36,000 copies in the US as of August 2015.

Track listing

Weekly charts

References

2014 albums
Timeflies albums